Back Up Off Me! is the only studio album by Yo! MTV Raps hosts Ed Lover and Doctor Dré. It was released on November 8, 1994 via Relativity Records. Production was handled by Franklyn Grant, Davy D, Erick Sermon, Jolly Stomper Productions, Marley Marl, The 45 King, T-Money, Ty Fyffe, Ed Lover & Doctor Dré. It features guest appearances from Erick Sermon & Keith Murray of Def Squad, Lords of the Underground, Naima Bowman, Notorious B.I.G. of Junior M.A.F.I.A., Todd-1, and T-Money of Original Concept.

Back Up Off Me! was a mild success, peaking at #91 on the Top R&B/Hip-Hop Albums and #27 on the Top Heatseekers charts in the United States. The album spawned two charting singles: "Back Up Off Me!" and "For the Love of You". Its title track peaked at #85 on the Billboard Hot 100 and at #23 on the Hot Rap Singles, and its second single, "For the Love of You", peaked at #47 on the Hot Rap Singles chart.

Track listing

Chart history

References

External links
 

1994 debut albums
Relativity Records albums
Albums produced by Erick Sermon
Albums produced by Marley Marl
Albums produced by Ty Fyffe
Hip hop albums by American artists